On a Ona is the sixth studio album by Collegium Musicum, released on OPUS in 1979.

Track listing

Official releases
 1979: On a Ona, LP, MC, OPUS, #9113 0727
 1997: On a Ona, re-release, CD, bonus track, #91 2614
 2007: On a Ona, re-release, CD #91 2776

Credits and personnel

 Marián Varga - music, piano, Wersi organ, synthesizer (Arp, Rolland, Polymoog)
 Pavol Hammel - music, lead vocal, acoustic guitar
 Marika Gombitová - lead vocal
 Ľudovít Nosko - lead vocal
 Fedor Frešo - guitar
 Pavol Kozma - drums, percussions
 Peter Peteraj - solo guitar
 František Griglák - solo guitar (guest)
 Boris Filan - lyrics

 Ján Lauko - producer
 Juraj Filo - sound director
 Ivan Minárik - technician
 Milan Vašica - responsible editor
 Tibor Borský - photography
 Ivan Popovič - design
 Marie Rottrová - lead vocal (bonus track)
 Kamil Peteraj - lyrics (bonus track)
 Marie Rottrová - lead vocal (bonus track)

References

General

Specific

1979 albums
Collegium Musicum (band) albums
Pop rock albums by Slovak artists